Limneria undata is a species of small sea snail, a marine gastropod mollusk in the family Velutinidae.

Distribution
Distribution of Limneria undata include:
 European waters
 USA: Cobscook Bay
 Clam Cove
 Frost Cove 44.993197, -67.063513]{}
 L'Etang

Description 
The maximum recorded shell length is 27 mm.

Habitat 
Minimum recorded depth is 0 m. Maximum recorded depth is 1127 m.

References

External links

Velutinidae
Gastropods described in 1839